Dipti Saravanamuttu (born 1960) is a contemporary Sri Lankan-Australian poet and academic.

Dipti Saravanamuttu was born in Sri Lanka and arrived in Australia with her family in 1972. After studying English at Sydney University, apart from writing, she has worked as a journalist, a scriptwriter and has taught at the University of London.

The subject matter of her poetry ranges from everyday conversation to literary theory with some emphasis on issues of social justice. Her collection The Colosseum won the Age Book of the Year Dinny O'Hearn award for Poetry in 2005.

Bibliography

Poetry
Statistic For The New World (Rochford Street, 1988)
Language of the Icons (Angus & Robertson, 1993) 
The Colosseum (Five Islands, 2004)

Fiction
Dancing From The Edge of Darkness (Papyrus, 2000)

References

External links
4 poems
Anatolian Sonata
For Eastern Europe
The Festival
Review of The Colosseum from Famous Reporter

1960 births
Living people
Australian people of Sri Lankan Tamil descent
Australian poets
Australian women poets